Ivan Jablonka is a French historian and writer.

Scholarship
Born in 1973 in Paris, an alumnus of the École normale supérieure, he is professor of Contemporary History at the Sorbonne Paris North University, editorial director of the collection “La République des idées” (Éditions du Seuil), and one of the editors of the online magazine La Vie des Idées.

His scholarship encompasses abandoned children, the welfare state, gender violence, masculinity, and new forms of historical writing. He documented the fate of his grandparents, Jewish refugees from Poland in occupied France, eventually murdered in Auschwitz in 1943, in A History of the Grandparents I Never Had (Stanford UP, 2016).

He received the Prix Médicis in 2016 for Laëtitia ou la fin des hommes, « an openly feminist book » that tells the story of a young girl murdered at the age of 18,

His book History Is a Contemporary Literature (Cornell UP, 2018) offers perspectives on the writing of History, and the relationship between Literature and the social sciences. Jablonka argues that History, along with Sociology and Anthropology, can “achieve greater rigor and wider audiences by creating a literary text, written and experienced through a broad spectrum of narrative modes and rhetorical figures”. Conversely, a whole range of literary texts —travel logs, memoirs, autobiographies, testimonies, diaries, life stories, and news reports— can implement methods and lines of reasoning inspired by the social sciences.

His book A History of Masculinity: From Patriarchy to Gender Justice (Allen Lane, 2022) reimagines the cultures and norms that shape ideas of the “male self”. Arguing that “men are trapped in a gender prison”, he offers a reflection on ancient and modern masculinities, gender justice, and a guide to being a ‘just man’ (un homme juste in French).

Reception
He has given lectures all over the world, notably at the University of Geneva and the University of Lausanne in Switzerland, at the Free University of Berlin in Germany, at the National University of General San Martín in Argentina, at Nanzan University in Japan, and in the US: at Yale University, Boston University, UC Berkeley, Stanford University, and Texas A&M.

He was a visiting professor at New York University in 2020.

His books have been translated into fifteen languages.

Awards
 In 2012, for Histoire des grands-parents que je n'ai pas eus (A History of the Grandparents I Never Had):
 Senate Prize for History Books, 
 Guizot Prize from the Académie française
 Augustin-Thierry Prize at the Rendez-vous de l'Histoire.
 In 2016, for Laëtitia ou la fin des hommes (Laëtitia or the End of Men):
 Literary Prize from Le Monde.
 Prix Médicis of the French Novel.
 In 2018, for En camping-car (Van Life) :
 France Télévisions Prize for the Best Essay.

Works in French

Works in English

Jablonka, Ivan (2008), « Fictive Kinship: Wards and Foster Parents in Nineteenth-Century France », in Susan Broomhall (ed.), Emotions in the Household, 1200-1900, New York: Palgrave Macmillan, 2008, p. 269 - 284.
Jablonka, Ivan (2011), « Children and the State », in Ed Berenson, Vincent Duclert, Cristophe Prochasson (eds.), The French Republic, Ithaca: Cornell University Press, 2011, p. 315 - 323.
Jablonka, Ivan (2013), « Social Welfare in the Western World and the Rights of Children (19th-21st centuries) », in Paula Fass (ed.), The Routledge History of Childhood in the Western World, New York: Routledge, 2013, p. 380 - 399.
Jablonka, Ivan (2016), « History and Comics, » Books and Ideas, 30 May 2016.
Jablonka, Ivan (2018), “The Future of the Human Sciences,” French Politics, Culture, and Society, Vol. 36, No. 3, December 2018, p. 109 – 117.

External links 
 Ivan Jablonka on BNF
 Ivan Jablonka on France Culture
 Ivan Jablonka on France Inter
 Jablonka's Biography on Modern Novel
 Special Issue on Jablonka's work in the journal French Politics, Culture & Society

References

Living people
1973 births
Academic staff of the University of Paris
École Normale Supérieure alumni
21st-century French historians
Prix Médicis winners